Sisinio González Martínez (born 22 April 1986), commonly known as Sisi , is a Spanish professional footballer who plays as a left winger.

Club career
Sisi was born in Albacete, Castile-La Mancha. A product of Valencia CF's youth system – he arrived aged 15 from hometown's Albacete Balompié – he first served loan stints in the Segunda División, with Hércules CF and Real Valladolid, with a 2007 top-flight promotion with the latter (he also appeared in the Segunda División B with the former). Whilst playing with Valladolid, the football site Goal.com mentioned him as one of the emergent talents in Spain.

In July 2008, Sisi was sold by Valencia to La Liga club Recreativo de Huelva. Midway through his first and only season he was diagnosed with hepatitis A, being rendered unavailable for two months; he made his return as a substitute on 4 April 2009, in a 0–1 home loss against Andalusia neighbours Sevilla FC.

On 24 August 2009, after Recre'''s relegation, Sisi returned to Valladolid, signing a three-year contract. He scored on his debut in a 2–1 win at Real Zaragoza, but was injured through most of the campaign and suffered relegation for the second consecutive time.

Sisi scored a career-best five goals in 2011–12 (from 36 appearances) as the Castile and León side returned to the top flight after two years. In the subsequent off-season he joined CA Osasuna, being hindered by two severe knee injuries during his spell, the last one contracted after only five minutes of the home fixture against FC Barcelona.

In the summer of 2015, aged 29, Sisi moved abroad for the first time, joining Suwon FC in the K League Challenge. In the following transfer window, he reunited with former Osasuna boss Jan Urban at Lech Poznań after agreeing to a six-month deal.

On 25 August 2016, Sisi signed a one-year contract with Veria FC. Until his retirement, he competed exclusively in Japan's J2 League.

International career
In the 2003 FIFA U-17 World Championship, Sisi was a key element for Spain, who finished runners-up to Brazil (0–1). FIFA described him in their technical report as a "...well-developed technique and ball control, fast and agile", as he was listed amongst the nation's Talented Players'' list.

Two years later, Sisi appeared against France in the 2005 UEFA European Under-19 Championship, as the national team failed to qualify for the final stages in Northern Ireland, losing 1–0 in the elite round. In 2007, he progressed to the under-21s.

Club statistics

Notes

References

External links

1986 births
Living people
Sportspeople from Albacete
Spanish footballers
Footballers from Castilla–La Mancha
Association football wingers
La Liga players
Segunda División players
Segunda División B players
Valencia CF Mestalla footballers
Hércules CF players
Real Valladolid players
Recreativo de Huelva players
CA Osasuna players
K League 2 players
Suwon FC players
Ekstraklasa players
Lech Poznań players
Super League Greece players
Veria F.C. players
J2 League players
FC Gifu players
Tokushima Vortis players
Ehime FC players
Spain youth international footballers
Spain under-21 international footballers
Spanish expatriate footballers
Expatriate footballers in South Korea
Expatriate footballers in Poland
Expatriate footballers in Greece
Expatriate footballers in Japan
Spanish expatriate sportspeople in South Korea
Spanish expatriate sportspeople in Poland
Spanish expatriate sportspeople in Greece
Spanish expatriate sportspeople in Japan